Midway, Arkansas may refer to any one of many locations in the U.S. state of Arkansas:

Midway, Baxter County, Arkansas, an unincorporated community and census-designated place in Baxter County
Midway, Clark County, Arkansas, an unincorporated community in Clark County
Midway, Hot Spring County, Arkansas, a town in Hot Spring County
Midway, Howard County, Arkansas, an unincorporated community in Howard County
Midway (ghost town), Howard County, Arkansas, a ghost town in Howard County
Midway, Jackson County, Arkansas, an unincorporated community in Jackson County
Midway, Jefferson County, Arkansas, an unincorporated community in Jefferson County
Midway, Lafayette County, Arkansas, an unincorporated community in Lafayette County
Midway, Lee County, Arkansas, an unincorporated community in Lee County
Midway, Logan County, Arkansas, an unincorporated community in Logan County
Midway, Marion County, Arkansas, an unincorporated community in Marion County
Midway, Mississippi County, Arkansas, an unincorporated community in Mississippi County
Midway, Nevada County, Arkansas, an unincorporated community in Nevada County
Midway, St. Francis County, Arkansas, an unincorporated community in St. Francis County
Midway (near Bald Knob), White County, Arkansas, an unincorporated community in White County near the city of Bald Knob
Midway (near Pleasant Plains), White County, Arkansas, an unincorporated community in White County near the town of Pleasant Plains